Bathelt is a German surname. Notable people with the surname include:
 Hans Bathelt, German drummer, percussionist and lyricist
 Harald Bathelt (born 1960), German-Canadian geographer
Surnames of Austrian origin

German-language surnames
Surnames of German origin